Hasanabad (also Romanized as Ḩasanābād) is a village in Nasrovan Rural District, in the Central District of Darab County, Fars Province, Iran. At the 2006 census, its population was 160, in 33 families.

References 

Populated places in Darab County